Numídico Bessone (1913–1985) was a Portuguese sculptor.

1913 births
1985 deaths
Prix de Rome winners
People from Lagoa, Azores
20th-century Portuguese sculptors
Male sculptors
20th-century Portuguese male artists
University of Porto alumni